The 1947 Currie Cup was the 22nd edition of the Currie Cup, the premier domestic rugby union competition in South Africa.

See also

 Currie Cup

References

1947
1947 in South African rugby union